Delphi Schools, Inc. operates private schools that use the study methods known as Study Tech that were developed by  L. Ron Hubbard. The headquarters for Delphi Schools, Inc. are located on the property of the founding school, The Delphian School, in Yamhill County, Oregon, near Sheridan. The organization's publishing arm operates under the assumed business name of Heron Books. This is also the address where The Delphian School is located. It was incorporated in 1973 as the Delphi Foundation, and changed to the present name in 1987. Delphi Schools says that its schools teach using "The Delphi Program", which "is a unique, integrated approach to learning". The Study Technology is licensed through the Scientology related group Applied Scholastics. Several Delphi schools use the Heron Basics Program of Heron Books for instruction.

Campus information 
In addition to The Delphian School, Delphi Schools, Inc. operates Delphi Academy schools in Los Angeles, Santa Clara, Campbell, California, San Diego, as well as Milton, Massachusetts, and Clearwater, Florida.  

Oregon, Los Angeles and Clearwater, FL schools offer a high school program (PS-12) and grant graduates a high school diploma.  The remaining Delphi schools offer a kindergarten to middle school (K-8 or K-9) or a kindergarten to elementary school (K-6) education.

Accreditation 
The Delphian School is an accredited member of the Pacific Northwest Association of Independent Schools.

The Delphi Academy of Los Angeles is listed with the California Department of Education as offering a high school diploma. It has received accreditation by both recognized regional accreditation bodies, the Western Association of Schools and Colleges (WASC) and the California Association of Independent Schools (CAIS).

References

External links

 Delphi Schools
 Case study of L. Ron Hubbard's education: The Delphi Academy in LA by Steve Keller

Private schools in the United States
Scientology-related schools